Indigo was a restaurant founded by the Indian chef Rahul Akerkar in 1999 in Mumbai, India, which was in a restored colonial bungalow behind the Taj Mahal Palace Hotel. The restaurant gained iconic status as it was one of the first standalone fine-dining restaurants in the country to serve quality European cuisine, while functioning independently outside the luxury hotels industry. It is credited with influencing the Indian restaurant industry in the country's post-liberalisation era. Food critic Vir Sanghvi called the restaurant "one of the most important establishments in Indian restaurant history". It was included in the top 60 restaurants in the world by Condé Nast Traveler.

The restaurant closed on 29 April 2018, following the expiration of the property's lease and failed renegotiations.

History and significance

Akerkar worked in restaurants in the United States for a decade before returning to India in 1989. He ran two influential eateries, Just Desserts and Under the Over, in the 1990s before founding deGustibus Hospitality and opening Indigo in 1999. At a time when it was difficult to find high quality Continental food outside five-star hotels, the restaurant came to be noted for its innovation in the industry, by relying on carefully sourced ingredients and ever-changing menus. The restaurant often had a waiting list of more than three months and was frequented by noted personalities. The Rolling Stones dined at the restaurant after playing in Mumbai, and the restaurant played host to David Cameron, Salman Rushdie, Brad Pitt, Angelina Jolie. 

In her 2019 book that surveyed the Indian restaurant industry, Business on a Platter: What Makes Restaurants Sizzle or Fizzle Out, food writer Anoothi Vishal wrote: "Indigo...ushered in a new type of restaurant in India. These can be defined as experiential restaurants, where a younger lot of diners went not just to satisfy a basic need for food, but to meet an aspiration for a certain lifestyle the restaurant symbolized."

Closure
The lease of the colonial bungalow, where the restaurant was housed, expired in April 2018. After the extension negotiations with the landlord failed, the holding company, deGustibus, decided to close the restaurant, and the last customers were served on 29 April, 2018.

References

Bibliography

External links

Restaurants in Mumbai
Defunct restaurants
Restaurants established in 1999
Restaurants disestablished in 2018
Indian companies disestablished in 2018
Indian companies established in 1999
1999 establishments in Maharashtra